Margaret Kelly may refer to:

 Margaret Kelly (civil servant), acting director of the United States Mint by 1911
 Margaret B. Kelly (born 1935), American accountant and politician from Missouri
 Margaret Kelly (dancer) (1910–2004), Irish dancer and the founder of the Bluebell Girls dance troupe
 Margaret Kelly (swimmer) (born 1956), British swimmer
Margaret Kelly (pharmacologist) (1906–1968), American pharmacologist 
 Margaret Skillion (née Kelly), sister of Australian bushrangers Ned Kelly and Dan Kelly
 Margaret Kelly, first wife of Bill Murray